The Fenian Rising of 1867 was a rebellion against British rule in Ireland, organised by the Irish Republican Brotherhood (IRB).

After the suppression of the  Irish People newspaper in September 1865, disaffection among Irish radical nationalists continued to smoulder, and during the later part of 1866, IRB leader James Stephens endeavoured to raise funds in the United States for a fresh rising planned for the following year. 

However the rising of 1867 proved poorly organised. A brief rising took place in County Kerry in February, followed by an attempt at nationwide insurrection, including an attempt to take Dublin in early March. Due to poor planning and British infiltration of the nationalists, the rebellion never got off the ground. Most of the leaders in Ireland were arrested, but although some of them were sentenced to death, none suffered execution. There followed a series of attacks in England aimed at freeing Fenian prisoners, including a bomb in London and an attack on a prison van in Manchester, for which three Fenians, subsequently known as the Manchester martyrs, were executed in November 1867.

Background
The Fenians were a transatlantic association consisting of the Irish Republican Brotherhood, founded in Dublin by James Stephens in 1858, and the Fenian Brotherhood, founded in the United States by John O'Mahony and Michael Doheny, also in 1858. Their aim was the establishment of an independent Irish Republic by force of arms. In 1865, the Fenians began preparing for a rebellion. With the ending of the American Civil War, they hoped to recruit willing Irish veterans of that war for an insurrection in Ireland. They collected about 6,000 firearms and had as many as 50,000 men willing to fight. In September 1865, the British moved to close down the Fenians' newspaper The Irish People and arrested much of the leadership, including John O'Leary, Jeremiah O'Donovan Rossa, Bryan Dillon, Thomas Clarke Luby and Stephens. Stephens, the leader of the movement, later escaped. In 1866, habeas corpus was suspended in Ireland and there were hundreds more arrests of Fenian activists.

Stephens' successor as leader, Thomas J. Kelly tried to launch the insurrection in early 1867, but it proved uncoordinated and fizzled in a series of skirmishes. The plan was for a country-wide campaign of guerrilla warfare, accompanied by an uprising in Dublin in which Fenian fighters would link up with Irish troops who had mutinied and take the military barracks in the city.

Preparation
In February 1867 Fenians, one of whom was Michael Davitt, attacked Chester Castle in order to obtain arms for the rising. The revolt's organisers had hoped to benefit from considerable support among Irish nationals, or their descendants, living in England. The arms stored in the castle were to be seized, the telegraph wires cut, the rolling stock on the railway to be appropriated for transport to Holyhead, where shipping was to be seized and a descent made on Dublin before the authorities should have time to interfere. This scheme was frustrated by information given to the government by the informer John Joseph Corydon, one of Stephens' most trusted agents.

Rising

On 14 February 1867 there was an attempted rising in County Kerry. The Fenians attacked a coastguard station, robbed a man's house and stole his horses, and killed one policeman before heading towards Killarney. When the Fenians were near the town it was discovered that the Irish Constabulary and British Army were occupying it. They then retreated by passing between the Toomey Mountains and MacGillycuddy Reeks.

On 5 March 1867, risings took place in Dublin, Cork City  and Limerick. The largest of these engagements took place at Tallaght, County Dublin, when several hundred Fenians, on their way to the meeting point at Tallaght Hill, were attacked by the Constabulary near the police barracks, and were driven off after a firefight.

The rebels burnt down police barracks at Ballingarry, Emly, Gortavoher and Roskeen, in County Tipperary. A number of rebels armed with pikes gathered at Ballyhurst outside Tipperary town led by Colonel Thomas Francis Bourke of Fethard. A short battle took place with soldiers of the 31st Regiment which resulted in one man being killed and several wounded. Some escaped, though many were interned in Clonmel gaol to await trial. Before the end of the week the rising in Tipperary was crushed.

Around 40 men attacked a police barracks in Ardagh, County Limerick with guns, muskets and pikes.

A total of twelve people were killed across the country on the day. When it became apparent that the co-ordinated rising that had been planned was not transpiring, most rebels simply went home. The rising failed as a result of lack of arms and planning, but also because of the British authorities' effective use of informers. Most of the Fenian leadership had been arrested before the rebellion took place.

However, the rising was not without symbolic significance. The Fenians proclaimed a Provisional Republican government, stating,

The proclamation preceded the Easter 1916 Proclamation of the Irish Republic by almost 50 years. it also sheds some light on early Fenianism: it is centred with the ideas of republican democracy; however it is embedded with ideas of class struggle. The proclamation claims that their war was "against the aristocratic locusts, whether English or Irish" which denotes that their ideology at this time was in some way embedded in class differences against the landed aristocracy rather than merely against British rule.

Aftermath

On 11 September 1867, Colonel Thomas J. Kelly ("Deputy Central Organizer of the Irish Republic") was arrested in Manchester, where he had gone from Dublin to attend a council of the English "centres" (organisers), together with a companion, Captain Timothy Deasy. A plot to rescue these prisoners was hatched by Edward O'Meagher Condon with other Manchester Fenians; on 18 September, while Kelly and Deasy were being conveyed through the city from the courthouse, the prison van was attacked by Fenians armed with revolvers, and in the scuffle Police Sergeant Charles Brett, who was seated inside the van, was shot dead. The three Fenians, who were later executed, were remembered as the "Manchester Martyrs."

On the same day of November 1867, Ricard O'Sullivan Burke, who had been employed by the Fenians to purchase arms in Birmingham, was arrested and imprisoned in Clerkenwell Prison in London. In December, whilst he was awaiting trial a wall of the prison was blown down by gunpowder in order to effect his escape. The explosion caused the death of twelve people, and injured one hundred and twenty others. The Clerkenwell Outrage, for which Fenian Michael Barrett would suffer the death penalty, powerfully influenced William Ewart Gladstone in deciding that the Anglican Church of Ireland should be disestablished as a concession to Irish disaffection.

The Irish Times writing on 7 March 1867 called the rising a failure and futile while praising those who fought against the fenians as "gallant" and praised their "courage".

The rising itself was a total military failure, but it did have some political benefits for the Fenian movement. There were large protests in Ireland against the execution of Fenian prisoners, many of whose death sentences were, as a result, reprieved. In addition, the bravery of the three "Manchester Martyrs" on their execution provoked an emotional reaction among the Irish public, 17 monuments were erected in their honour and annual commemorations were held well into the 20th century. An Amnesty Association for Fenian prisoners was established by Isaac Butt, later the founder of the Home Rule League.

The Fenians themselves re-organised after the failure of the rising. In 1873, the Irish Republican Brotherhood adopted a new constitution, which stated that armed rebellion would not be pursued again until it had mass backing from the people. In 1879, the leaders of the IRB, principally John Devoy, decided on a New Departure, eschewing, for the time, physical force in favour of adopting the land question and building a broad nationalist movement. The Fenians, therefore, cooperated with the Land League in the land agitation from the 1870s onwards and in the rise of the Irish Parliamentary Party.

Not all Fenians agreed with this policy however, and several breakaway groups emerged that continued to believe in the use of political violence in pursuit of republican objectives. One was the Irish National Invincibles who assassinated the two most important British functionaries in Ireland, Frederick Cavendish and Thomas Henry Burke, Chief and Under Secretaries for Ireland, respectively, in Dublin in 1882 (see Phoenix Park Murders). Two other factions, one sponsored by O'Donovan Rossa, the other by the Irish-American Clan na Gael, carried out a bombing campaign in Britain between 1880 and 1887.

Related conflicts

The Fenian Brotherhood, especially a faction of it under William R. Roberts, mobilised up to 1,000 Irish veterans of the American Civil War to launch raids on British army forts, customs posts and other targets in Canada in order to bring pressure on Britain to withdraw from Ireland in 1866 and 1871. While the U.S. authorities arrested the men and confiscated their arms afterwards, there is speculation that many in the US government had turned a blind eye to the preparations for the invasion, angered at actions that could be construed as British assistance to the Confederacy during the American Civil War. There were five Fenian raids of note. While they had some minor successes against Canadian forces, they were militarily and politically unsuccessful.

Commemorations
In Ardagh in Limerick there was a reenactment of the attack on Ardagh police barracks and a plaque was unveiled on the 150th anniversary of the rising. It was also commemorated in Nenagh.

In Music
In 1865, Henry Wood wrote the words for and Henry Tucker wrote the music for a song called "When Fenians Fight for Freedom".

The folk song "The Galway Races" contains a reference to the residents of Cork City who "brought home the Fenian prisoners from diverse nations."

See also
Catalpa rescue
Cuba Five
Fenian Raids
List of Irish uprisings
List of monuments and memorials to the Fenian Rebellion

References

Conflicts in 1867
Rebellions in Ireland
Irish Republican Brotherhood
Irish-American history
1867 in Ireland
19th-century rebellions
Rebellions against the British Empire